Mari Petroleum Company Limited (MPCL) is a Pakistani petroleum exploration and production company based in Islamabad, Pakistan. The company is controlled by the Fauji Foundation with 40 percent shares.

It is operating the country’s second largest gas reservoir at Mari Field, District Ghotki, Sindh. MPCL is primarily engaged in exploration, development and production of hydrocarbon products (natural gas, crude oil, condensate, and liquefied petroleum gas).

It is listed and traded on the Pakistan Stock Exchange.

History
In 1957, when MPCL was operating as Esso Eastern Inc., the Mari Gas Field was discovered in Daharki, Ghotki District, Sindh, Pakistan, with an original gas in place (GIIP) estimate of 2.38 TCF. Over the years, with the phased development of the Field and subsequent reservoir evaluations, the GIIP of the Field was enhanced to 10.751TCF, thus making Mari one of the largest gas fields in Pakistan in terms of balance reserves.

In May 1983, the Fauji Foundation, a major Pakistani group, along with OGDCL (Oil and Gas Development Company, Ltd.) and the Government of Pakistan acquired the entire business operation of Esso Eastern Inc. in Pakistan, which included the Mari Gas Field.

In December 1984, the business was reorganized and incorporated as Mari Petroleum Company Limited, and it acquired the assets, liabilities, and operational control of the Mari Gas Field.
MPCL primarily operated as a production company until 1997, when it began the phased development of the Habib Rahi Reservoir to supply gas for new fertilizer plants. The company also simultaneously pursued appraisal activities within its Mari D&P Lease by drilling step out wells to determine the boundaries of the Habib Rahi Reservoir.

The hallmark of MPCL's growth and expansion is also represented by its entry into exploration activities in 2001.

Price agreement
Mari's tariff was cost-plus but it was changed to international crude prices, starting from 2014-2015.

Exploration
MPCL started extensive geological and geophysical exploration in 2001, often in partnerships with local and international exploration and production companies to tap indigenous hydrocarbon resources of the country. MPCL’s success ratio in 2013-14 was 100 percent as MPCL drilled five oil/gas wells and all were successful which resulted in a significant increase in the company's oil/gas production. Last year MPCL share prices were trading at around Rs 400 per share, which has now crossed Rs. 900 per share.

MPCL's success ratio is 1:1.4, which is high compared to other E&P companies which average 1:4; internationally the ratio is 1:8. About 78% of MPCL's gas production is dedicated to fertilizer plants, and the company is playing a very critical role in the growth of the agriculture sector. Currently, MPCL is working in 17 oil/gas blocks, of which 11 blocks are entirely being explored by MPCL while in the other 6 blocks MPCL is a joint partner.

MPCL Operated Blocks
   Mari D&P Lease; MPCL has 100% working interest
   Zarghun South D&P Lease; MPCL has 35% working interest
   Sujawal Block; MPCL has 100% working interest
   Peshawar East; MPCL has 98.2% working interest
   Ziarat Block; MPCL has 60% working interest
   Ghauri Block; MPCL has 35% working interest 
   Karak Block; MPCL has 60% working interest 
   Sukkur Block; MPCL has 58.8% working interest
   Harnai Block; MPCL has 40% working interest
   Bannu West Block; MPCL has 35% working interest

MPCL Non-operated Blocks
   Hala Block; MPCL has 35% working interest
   Kohlu Block; MPCL has 30% working interest
   Kalchas Block; MPCL has 20% working interest
   Kohat Block; MPCL has 20% working interest
   Shah Bandar Block; MPCL has 32% working interest

National Resources Limited 
National Resources Limited (NRL) is created as joint venture to involve in among other things, exploration, survey, extraction, excavation, mining and sale of produced minerals. Y.B. Pakistan, Arif Habib Equity, Liberty Mills, and Reliance Commodities are the Joint Venture partners. Each will have 20% share.

References

External links

 Fauji Foundation
 Pakistani companies established in 1984
 Companies based in Islamabad
 Companies listed on the Pakistan Stock Exchange
 Oil and gas companies of Pakistan
 1983 mergers and acquisitions
 Energy companies established in 1984
 ExxonMobil